Thomas Duncombe Dee (November 10, 1844 – July 9, 1905) was an American businessman from Utah.

Biography
Dee was born in Llanelli, Carmarthenshire, Wales. His parents converted to the Church of Jesus Christ of Latter-day Saints (LDS Church) in 1856, and the family relocated to Ogden, Utah, in 1860.

Dee had been working as an apprentice carpenter in Wales and soon was building residential and commercial buildings in Ogden. In 1876, he joined industrialist David Eccles and Hiram Spencer in founding businesses in the western U.S., ranging from sugar to lumber to water and shoes and banking.

In 1900, Dee became an investor and first president of the Utah Construction Company of Ogden, Utah. On July 3, 1905, he slipped into the water while inspecting a potential site for a dam, contracted pneumonia, and died. In 1906, the community was named Dee, Oregon, in his honor.

Dee served for over 20 years as the LDS Church's Sunday School superintendent in the Ogden Third Ward and then in the Mound Fort Ward. For almost two decades preceding his death, he served as a counselor to the bishop of the Mound Fort Ward.

Among several other civic positions, Dee served as a member of the Ogden City Council.

References

Sources 
Jenson, Andrew. Latter-day Saints Biographical Encyclopedia, vol. 3, p. 58

External links 
 McKay-Dee Hospital, History

1844 births
1905 deaths
People from Llanelli
Welsh emigrants to the United States
American leaders of the Church of Jesus Christ of Latter-day Saints
Utah city council members
Deaths from pneumonia in Utah
Mormon pioneers
Businesspeople from Ogden, Utah
Welsh leaders of the Church of Jesus Christ of Latter-day Saints
Sunday School (LDS Church) people
Latter Day Saints from Utah